Famoxadone is a fungicide to protect agricultural products against various fungal diseases on fruiting vegetables, tomatoes, potatoes, curcurbits, lettuce and grapes. It is used in combination with cymoxanil. Famoxadone is a QI, albeit with a chemistry different from most QIs. (It is an oxazolidine-dione while most are strobilurins.) It is commonly used against Plasmopara viticola, Alternaria solani, Phytophthora infestans, and Septoria nodorum.

Molecular interaction
Famoxadone is of lesser interaction strength at the Q pocket than some other QIs, for example, azoxystrobin. This is because azoxystrobin and such interact more centrally in the Q pocket than does famoxadone.

Resistance management
Although it has a different chemistry, famoxadone shows full cross-resistance with the rest of the main FRAC group 11 that it belongs to, which is almost entirely strobs. It has not shown cross-resistance with the 11A subgroup however. As with all QIs there is a high risk of resistance development and so pesticide stewardship is important.

Populations of P. infestans and A. solani in northern and western Europe are not known to be resistant to famoxadone.

External links

References

Fungicides
Oxazolidinediones
Phenol ethers
Quinone outside inhibitors